The Billboard Music Award for Top Rock Song winners and nominees. Collective Soul and Panic! At the Disco are the only groups/artists to win twice.

Winners and nominees

Superlatives

The following individuals received two or more Top Rock Song Awards:

The following individuals received two or more Top Rock Song nominations:

References

Billboard awards
Rock music awards
Song awards